Since Alaska's admission to the Union in January 1959, it has participated in 16 United States presidential elections, always having 3 electoral votes. In the 1960 presidential election, Alaska was narrowly won by the Republican Party's candidate and incumbent vice president Richard Nixon, defeating the Democratic Party's candidate John F. Kennedy by a margin of just 1.88% (1,144 votes). In the 1964 presidential election, the Democratic Party's candidate Lyndon B. Johnson won Alaska in a national Democratic landslide victory. Since the 1964 election, Alaska has been won by the Republican Party in every presidential election.

Ronald Reagan, the Republican candidate in the 1984 presidential election, won Alaska by 36.78%, which remains the largest margin of victory in the state's history. Ross Perot, the independent candidate in the 1992 presidential election, received the highest vote share (28.43%) ever won by a third-party candidate in Alaska. Various news organizations have characterized Alaska as a safe Republican state. No Republican has won the presidency without carrying Alaska since its statehood in 1959 due to Lyndon B. Johnson being the only Democrat candidate to ever carry the state.

Presidential elections

Graph
The following graph shows the margin of victory of the winner over the runner-up in the 16 presidential elections Alaska participated.

See also
 Elections in Alaska
 List of United States presidential election results by state

Notes

References

Works cited